When Will I Be Loved may refer to:

When Will I Be Loved?, a 1990 television film directed by Michael Tuchner
When Will I Be Loved (film), a 2004 film directed by James Toback
"When Will I Be Loved" (song), a 1960 single by The Everly Brothers covered in 1975 by Linda Ronstadt